Tarzan is a 1999 American animated adventure film produced by Walt Disney Feature Animation and released by Walt Disney Pictures. The 37th film produced by the studio, and the tenth and last released during the Disney Renaissance era, it is based on the 1912 story Tarzan of the Apes by Edgar Rice Burroughs, being the first animated major motion picture version of the story. The film was directed by Kevin Lima and Chris Buck (in his feature directorial debut) and produced by Bonnie Arnold from a screenplay by Tab Murphy, Bob Tzudiker, and Noni White. The film stars the voices of Tony Goldwyn, Minnie Driver, Glenn Close, Rosie O'Donnell, Brian Blessed, Lance Henriksen, Wayne Knight, and Nigel Hawthorne.

Pre-production of Tarzan began in 1995, with Lima selected as director and Buck joining him the same year. Following Murphy's first draft, Tzudiker, White, and Dave Reynolds were brought in to reconstruct the third act and add additional material to the screenplay. English recording artist Phil Collins was recruited to compose and record songs integrated with a score by Mark Mancina. Meanwhile, the production team embarked on a research trip to Uganda and Kenya to study the gorillas. The animation of the film combines 2D hand-drawn animation with the extensive use of computer-generated imagery, and it was done in California, Orlando, and Paris, with the pioneering computer animation software system Deep Canvas being predominantly used to create three-dimensional backgrounds.

Tarzan premiered at the El Capitan Theatre in Los Angeles on June 12, 1999, and was released in the United States on June 16. It received positive reviews from critics, who praised its voice performances, music, animation, and action sequences. Against a production budget of $130 million (then the most expensive traditionally animated film ever made until Treasure Planet in 2002), the film grossed $448.2 million worldwide, becoming the fifth highest-grossing film of 1999, the second highest-grossing animated film of 1999 behind Toy Story 2, and the first Disney animated feature to open at first place at the North American box office since Pocahontas (1995). It won the Academy Award for Best Original Song ("You'll Be in My Heart" by Phil Collins). The film has led to many derived works, such as a Broadway adaptation, a television series, and two direct-to-video followups, Tarzan & Jane (2002) and Tarzan II (2005).

Plot

In the 1880s, a British couple and their infant son are shipwrecked in Equatorial Africa. The adults build a treehouse but are killed by Sabor, a leopard. Kala, a gorilla who lost her son to Sabor, adopts the human infant and names him Tarzan; although Kerchak, her mate and the gorilla leader, objects.

Years later, Tarzan begins to befriend other animals, including Kala’s niece Terk and the paranoid elephant, Tantor. Tarzan finds himself treated differently because of his different physique, so he makes valiant efforts to improve himself. As an adult, Tarzan manages to kill Sabor with a spear, gaining Kerchak's reluctant approval.

Meanwhile, a team of human explorers from England, consisting of Professor Archimedes Q. Porter, his daughter Jane, and their hunter escort Clayton, are looking to study the gorillas. Jane accidentally becomes separated from the group and is chased by a baboon troop, until Tarzan rescues her out of sheer curiosity. After comparing her to himself, he realizes they are similar. Jane leads Tarzan back to their camp, where Porter and Clayton both take interest in him; the former in terms of scientific progress, while the latter hopes to have Tarzan lead the group to the gorillas. Despite Kerchak's warnings to avoid the strangers, Tarzan repeatedly returns to the camp. Porter, Clayton, and Jane teach him how to speak English properly, and tell him what the human world is like. Tarzan and Jane begin to fall in love; however, she has difficulty convincing Tarzan to lead the humans to the gorillas, as Tarzan fears Kerchak's fury.

The explorers' ship soon returns to retrieve them. Jane asks Tarzan to return with them to England, but Tarzan, in turn, asks Jane to stay with him when Jane says it is unlikely that they will ever return. Clayton convinces Tarzan that Jane will stay with him forever as long as he leads them to the gorillas; Tarzan agrees, and leads the trio to the nesting grounds while Terk and Tantor lure Kerchak. Porter and Jane are excited to mingle with the gorillas, but Kerchak returns and attacks the humans on sight. Tarzan restrains Kerchak while the humans escape; afterward, Kerchak accuses Tarzan of betraying his family, causing Tarzan to flee in shame. Kala takes Tarzan to the treehouse where she found him, reveals his true past, and says that she wants him to be happy whatever he decides. Tarzan puts on his late father's suit, signifying his decision to go to England.

When Tarzan boards the ship with Jane and Porter the next day, they are ambushed by Clayton and his traitorous band of stowaway thugs. Now aware of the location of the nesting grounds, Clayton reveals his plans to capture and sell the gorillas for a fortune, and imprisons Tarzan, Jane, and Porter to prevent them from interfering. Tarzan manages to escape with the help of Terk and Tantor, and he returns to the jungle, rallying the animals to come to the aid of the gorillas and scare off the thugs. Clayton then mortally wounds Kerchak and battles Tarzan across the treetops. Although Tarzan spares Clayton's life and breaks his rifle, Clayton tries to kill him with his machete. Their battle comes to a cluster of vines, and Clayton tries to cut free when a vine becomes tangled around his neck, hanging him to death. Kerchak, with his dying breath, finally accepts Tarzan as his son, and names him the leader of the gorilla troop.

The next day, Porter and Jane prepare to leave on the ship, while Tarzan stays behind with the gorillas. As the ship's rowboat leaves shore, Porter encourages his daughter to stay with the man she loves, and Jane jumps overboard, followed soon after by her father. The Porters reunite with Tarzan and his family, and embark on their new life together.

Voice cast
 Tony Goldwyn as Tarzan, a 20-year-old man raised by gorillas who finds his human roots. Glen Keane served as the supervising animator for Tarzan as an adult, while John Ripa animated Tarzan as an infant and child. John Ripa studied the movements of young chimpanzees to use for young Tarzan's animation, while Glen Keane used movements of a gibbon and used it for the animation of adult Tarzan, he also watched his son Max Keane do his skateboarding and snowboarding and used surfers moves in the scenes where Tarzan is sliding through the trees. Goldwyn provided adult Tarzan's speaking voice, but his co-star Brian Blessed (the voice of Clayton) provided the Tarzan yell.
Alex D. Linz as young Tarzan
 Minnie Driver as Jane Porter, the eccentric, feisty, benevolent, and intelligent daughter of Professor Porter. She is the first of the group to encounter Tarzan and becomes his love interest. Ken Duncan served as the supervising animator for Jane. Many of Driver's mannerisms and characteristics were incorporated into Jane's animation. The scene where Jane describes meeting Tarzan for the first time to her father and Clayton was improvised by Driver, resulting in Ken Duncan animating one of the longest animated scenes on record. The scene took 7 weeks to animate and 73 feet of film.
 Glenn Close as Kala, Tarzan's adoptive mother, who found and raised him after losing her biological son to Sabor. She is also Kerchak's mate. Russ Edmonds served as the supervising animator for Kala.
 Lance Henriksen as Kerchak, Kala's mate and Tarzan's (reluctant) adoptive father, a silverback and leader of the gorilla troop, who struggles to accept Tarzan since he is a human. Bruce W. Smith served as the supervising animator for Kerchak.
 Brian Blessed as William Cecil Clayton, an intelligent and suave yet arrogant and treacherous hunter, who assists the Porters on their quest. Randy Haycock served as the supervising animator for Clayton, basing his design on Clark Gable and other film stars of the 1930s and 40s. Blessed also stepped up to provide the famous Tarzan yell.
 Nigel Hawthorne as Professor Archimedes Q. Porter, an eccentric, short-statured scientist and Jane's father. Dave Burgess served as the supervising animator for Porter. This was one of Hawthorne's two final acting roles before he died in 2001.
 Rosie O'Donnell as Terk (short for Terkina, a feminization of Terkoz merged with Teeka), Tarzan's best friend, a wisecracking gorilla. She is also Kala and Kerchak's niece, making her and Tarzan adoptive cousins. Michael Surrey served as the supervising animator for Terk.
 Wayne Knight as Tantor, a paranoid and submissive elephant, and Tarzan and Terk's close friend. Sergio Pablos served as the supervising animator for Tantor. Woody Allen was initially cast as Tantor, but Jeffrey Katzenberg persuaded Allen to leave the project and join DreamWorks' Antz (1998).
Taylor Dempsey as young Tantor. 
 Erik von Detten and Jason Marsden as Flynt and Mungo, a duo of young gorillas who are friends with Terk.
 Lily Collins as Baby Ape

Production

Development
Disney's Tarzan was the first Tarzan film to be animated. Thomas Schumacher, then-president of Walt Disney Feature Animation, expressed surprise there hadn't been any previous attempts to animate a Tarzan film, saying, "Here is a book that cries out to be animated. Yet we're the first filmmakers to have ever taken Tarzan from page to screen and presented the character as Burroughs intended." He noted that in animated form, Tarzan can connect to the animals on a deeper level than he can in live-action versions.

In 1994, when A Goofy Movie (1995) was nearly finished, Kevin Lima was approached to direct Tarzan by then-studio chairman Jeffrey Katzenberg. He had desired to have the film animated through the Disney Television Animation division with a new animation studio established in Canada. Lima was reluctant to the idea because of the animation complexities being done by inexperienced animators. Following Katzenberg's resignation from the Walt Disney Company, Lima was again contacted about the project by Michael Eisner, who decided to have the film produced through the Feature Animation division, by which Lima signed on.

Following this, Lima decided to read Tarzan of the Apes where he began to visualize the theme of two hands being held up against each other. That image became an important symbol of the relationships between characters in the film, and a metaphor of Tarzan's search for identity. "I was looking for something that would underscore Tarzan's sense of being alike, yet different from his ape family", Lima said, "The image of touching hands was first conceived as an idea for how Tarzan realizes he and Jane are physically the same."

Following his two-month study of the book, Lima approached his friend, Chris Buck, who had just wrapped up work as a supervising animator on Pocahontas (1995), to ask if he would be interested in serving as co-director. Buck was initially skeptical but accepted after hearing Lima's ideas for the film. By April 1995, the Los Angeles Times reported that the film was in its preliminary stages with Lima and Buck directing after Disney had obtained the story rights from the estate of Edgar Rice Burroughs.

Writing
Tab Murphy, who had just finished work on The Hunchback of Notre Dame (1996), was attracted to the theme of man-versus-nature in Tarzan, and began developing a treatment in January 1995. For the third act, Murphy suggested that Tarzan should leave for England, as he did in the book, but the directors felt that it was incompatible with their central theme of what defines a family. In order to keep Tarzan in the jungle, the third act needed to be restructured by redefining the role of the villain and inventing a way to endanger the gorillas. In this departure from Burroughs' novel, a villain named Clayton was created to serve as a guide for Professor Archimedes Q. Porter and his daughter, Jane. In addition to this, Kerchak was re-characterized from a savage silverback into the protector of the gorilla tribe. Also the Mangani, the apes that raised Tarzan in the original book were changed and portrayed as gorillas which were called Bolgani in the original story. Originally Sabor was portrayed as a lioness but was changed to a leopard due to the fact the film takes place in the jungle a place where leopards hunt rather than lions who roam in open grasslands, also leopards in the original novel where called Sheeta.

In January 1997, husband-and-wife screenwriting duo Bob Tzudiker and Noni White were hired to help refocus and add humor to the script as a way to balance the emotional weight of the film. Comedy writer Dave Reynolds was also brought on to write humorous dialogue for the film. "I was initially hired on for six weeks of rewriting and punch-up", Reynolds said, "A year and a half later, I finished. Either they liked my work, or I was very bad at time management." One challenge the writers faced was how Tarzan should learn about his past. "When Kala takes Tarzan back to the tree house, she is essentially telling him that he was adopted", Bonnie Arnold, the producer for Tarzan, said, "This is necessitated by him encountering humans and recognizing he is one of them." As a way to explore the feelings in that scene, Arnold brought in adoptive parents to talk with the story team. Another issue was the inherent and overt racism in the original Edgar Rice Burroughs' Tarzan.  The writers consciously chose to not include any African characters in order to avoid this topic.

Casting
Brendan Fraser auditioned twice for the title character before portraying the lead role in George of the Jungle (1997). Tony Goldwyn auditioned for the title role as well, and according to co-director Kevin Lima, Goldwyn landed it because of "the animal sense" in his readings, along with some "killer baboon imitations". For the signature Tarzan yell, Lima and Buck desired the traditional yell, although Goldwyn faced difficulties with providing the yell stating, "It's really hard to do, physically." His co-star Brian Blessed who does the voice of Clayton in the film ultimately provided the yell. Terk was originally written as a male gorilla, but following Rosie O'Donnell's audition, Terk was re-characterized as a female. Furthermore, Woody Allen was initially cast as the neurotic elephant Tantor. However, Katzenberg persuaded Allen to leave the project for DreamWorks' Antz (1998) and in exchange, the studio would distribute his next four films. Agreeing to the deal, Allen departed from Tarzan in 1996 and was replaced by Wayne Knight.

Animation
The animators were split into two teams, one in Paris and one in Burbank. The 6000-mile distance and difference in time zones posed challenges for collaboration, especially for scenes with Tarzan and Jane. Glen Keane was the supervising animator for Tarzan at the Paris studio, while Ken Duncan was the supervising animator for Jane at the studio in Burbank. To make coordinating scenes with multiple characters easier, the animators used a system called a "scene machine" that could send rough drawings between the two animation studios. Meanwhile, following production on Mulan (1998), two hundred animators at the Feature Animation Florida satellite studio provided character animation and special effects animation where the filmmakers had to discuss their work through daily video conferences among the three studios.

Keane was inspired to make Tarzan "surf" through the trees because of his son's interest in extreme sports, and he began working on a test scene. The directors expressed concern that Tarzan would be made into a "surfer dude", but when Keane revealed the test animation to them they liked it enough to use it in the film during the "Son of Man" sequence, with movements inspired by skateboarder Tony Hawk. Although Keane initially thought that Tarzan would be easy to animate because he only wears a loincloth, he realized that he would need a fully working human musculature while still being able to move like an animal. To figure out Tarzan's movements, the Paris animation team studied different animals in order to transpose their movements onto him. They also consulted with a professor of anatomy. This resulted in Tarzan being the first Disney character to accurately display working muscles.

To prepare for animating the gorillas, the animation team attended lectures on primates, made trips to zoos, and studied nature documentaries, with a group of animators also witnessing a gorilla dissection to learn about their musculature. In 1996, the animation team went on a two-week safari in Kenya to take reference photographs and observe the animals. On the trip, they visited Bwindi Impenetrable National Park in Uganda to view mountain gorillas in the wild, and get inspiration for the setting. In 2000, Chris Buck repeated the journey accompanied by journalists to promote the film's home video release.

To create the sweeping 3D backgrounds, Tarzans production team developed a 3D painting and rendering technique known as Deep Canvas (a term coined by artist/engineer Eric Daniels). This technique allows artists to produce CGI backgrounds that look like a traditional painting, according to art director Daniel St. Pierre. (The software keeps track of brushstrokes applied in 3D space.) For this advancement, the Academy of Motion Picture Arts and Sciences awarded the creators of Deep Canvas a Technical Achievement Award in 2003. After Tarzan, Deep Canvas was used for a number of sequences in Atlantis: The Lost Empire (2001), particularly large panoramic shots of the island and several action sequences. Expanded to support moving objects as part of the background, Deep Canvas was used to create about 75 percent of the environments in Disney's next major animated action film, Treasure Planet (2002).

Music

In 1995, Phil Collins was initially brought onto the project as a songwriter following a recommendation by Disney music executive Chris Montan. Early into production, directors Kevin Lima and Chris Buck decided not to follow Disney's musical tradition by having the characters sing. "I did not want Tarzan to sing", Lima stated, "I just couldn't see this half-naked man sitting on a branch breaking out in song. I thought it would be ridiculous." Instead, Collins would perform the songs in the film serving as the narrator. The choice of Collins, a popular and well established adult contemporary artist, led to comparisons with Elton John's earlier music for The Lion King (1994). Tarzan was dubbed in thirty-five languages—the most for any Disney movie at the time, and Collins recorded his songs in French, Italian, German, and Spanish for the dubbed versions of the film's soundtrack. According to Collins, most of the songs he wrote for Tarzan came from improvisation sessions and his reactions while reading the treatment. Three of the songs he wrote, "Son of Man", "Trashin' the Camp", and "Strangers Like Me", were based on his initial impressions after he read the source material. The other two songs were "You'll Be in My Heart", a lullaby sung to Tarzan by Kala (voiced by Glenn Close), and "Two Worlds", a song Collins wrote to serve as the anthem for Tarzan.

The instrumental scoring for the film was composed by Mark Mancina, who had previously produced music for The Lion King, and the musical of the same name. Mancina and Collins worked closely to create music that would complement the film's setting and used many obscure instruments from Mancina's personal collection in the score. "The idea of score and song arrangement came together as one entity, as Phil and I worked in tandem to create what's heard in the film", Mancina said.

Release
On June 12, 1999, the film premiered at the El Capitan Theater with the cast and filmmakers as attendees followed by a forty-minute concert with Phil Collins performing songs from the film. On July 23, 1999, Disney launched a digital projection release of Tarzan released only in three theatrical venues including Walt Disney World's Pleasure Island multiplex for three weeks. Although Star Wars: Episode I – The Phantom Menace and An Ideal Husband had been given earlier digital projection releases despite being shot on photographic film, Tarzan was notable for being the first major feature release to have been produced, mastered, and projected digitally.

Marketing
Disney Consumer Products released a series of toys, books, and stuffed animals for Tarzan, partnering with Mattel to produce a line of plush toys and action figures. Mattel also produced the Rad Repeatin' Tarzan action figure, but discontinued it after complaints regarding the toy's onanistic arm motions. Continuing its advertising alliance with McDonald's, its promotional campaign began on the film's opening day with several toys accompanied with Happy Meals and soda straws that replicated the Tarzan yell. Disney also worked with Nestle to create Tarzan themed candies, including a banana-flavored chocolate bar. In early 2000, Disney partnered again with McDonald's to release a set of eight Happy Meal toys as a tie-in for the film's home video. They also offered Tarzan themed food options, such as banana sundaes and jungle burgers.

Home media
On February 1, 2000, the film was released on VHS and DVD, as well as on LaserDisc on June 23, 2000 only in Japan, making Tarzan the last Disney animated feature to be released on the latter format. The DVD version contained bonus material, including the "Strangers Like Me" music video, the making of "Trashin' the Camp" featuring Collins and 'N Sync, and an interactive trivia game. A 2-Disc Collector's Edition was released on April 18, 2000. It included an audio commentary track recorded by the filmmakers, behind-the-scenes footage, and supplements that detailed the legacy of Tarzan and the film's development. These THX certified DVD releases featured the same bonus features, a sneak peek for Dinosaur and DVD-ROM. Both editions were placed in moratorium on January 31, 2002 and placed back into the Disney Vault. By January 2001, the film was the most successful home video release of 2000, earning retail revenues of $268 million.

On October 15, 2005, Disney released the Tarzan Special Edition on DVD. Tarzans first Blu-ray edition was released throughout Europe in early 2012, and on August 12, 2014, Disney released the Tarzan Special Edition on Blu-ray, DVD, and Digital HD.

Reception

Box office
Pre-release box office tracking indicated that Tarzan was appealing to all four major demographics noticeably for the first time for a Disney animated film since The Lion King (1994). The film was given a limited release on June 16, 1999, and its wide release followed two days later in 3,005 screens. During the weekend of June 18–21, Tarzan grossed $34.1 million ranking first at the box office, beating out Austin Powers: The Spy Who Shagged Me (1999). At the time, it also ranked second behind The Lion King (1994), which had earned $40.9 million, as the highest-earning box office opening for a Disney animated film. By August 1999, the domestic gross was projected to approach $170 million. Ultimately, the film closed its box office run earning $448.2 million worldwide.

Critical reaction
The critical consensus reads that "Disney's Tarzan takes the well-known story to a new level with spirited animation, a brisk pace, and some thrilling action set-pieces." Metacritic, which assigns a normalized rating out of 100 from top reviews from mainstream critics, calculated a score of 79 based on 27 reviews, indicating "generally favorable reviews". Audiences polled by CinemaScore gave the film an average grade of "A" on an A+ to F scale.

Entertainment Weekly compared the film's advancement in visual effects to that of The Matrix, stating that it had "the neatest computer-generated background work since Keanu Reeves did the backstroke in slow motion". They elaborate by describing how the characters moved seamlessly through the backgrounds themselves, giving the film a unique three-dimensional feel that far surpassed the quality of previous live-action attempts. Roger Ebert gave the film his highest rating of four stars, and he had similar comments about the film, describing it as representing "another attempt by Disney to push the envelope of animation", with scenes that "move through space with a freedom undreamed of in older animated films, and unattainable by any live-action process". Awarding the film three stars, James Berardinelli wrote: "From a purely visual standpoint, this may be the most impressive of all of Disney's traditionally animated features. The backdrops are lush, the characters are well realized, and the action sequences are dizzying, with frequent changes of perspectives and camera angles. No conventional animated film has been this ambitious before." Desson Howe, writing for The Washington Post, claimed the film "isn't up there with Aladdin, The Lion King and The Little Mermaid, but it's easily above the riffraff ranks of Hercules and Pocahontas". Todd McCarthy of Variety proved to be less amused by the animation, claiming it was "richly detailed and colorfully conceived, but the computer animation and graphics are often intermingled and combined in ways that are more distracting in their differences than helpful in their vividness".

Lisa Schwarzbaum, who graded the film an A−, applauded the film as "a thrilling saga about a natural man, untainted by the complications of 'civilized' life, who can anticipate changes in the air by sniffing the wind — swings because the Disney team, having sniffed the wind, went out on a limb and kept things simple". Peter Stack of the San Francisco Chronicle admired the film for tackling "meanings of family relationships and ideas about society, guardianship and compassion" and "cunning and greed and the ultimate evil", as well as remaining faithful to Burroughs's original novel. Kenneth Turan of Los Angeles Times wrote that the "story unfolds with dangers as well as warm humor; a jungle jam session called 'Trashin' the Camp' is especially hard to resist. We may have seen it all before, but when it's done up like this, experiencing it all over again is a pleasure." Janet Maslin, reviewing for The New York Times, similarly opined that "Tarzan initially looks and sounds like more of the same, to the point where Phil Collins is singing the words 'trust your heart' by the third line of his opening song. But it proves to be one of the more exotic blooms in the Disney hothouse, what with voluptuous flora, hordes of fauna, charming characters and excitingly kinetic animation that gracefully incorporates computer-generated motion."

The Radio Times review was not positive, stating the film "falls way short of Disney's best output" and featured "weak comic relief". The review concluded, "Lacking the epic sweep of Mulan or The Lion King, and laced with feeble background songs from Phil Collins (inexplicably awarded an Oscar), this King of the Swingers may be merchandise-friendly, but it's no jungle VIP." Michael Wilmington of the Chicago Tribune, while giving the film three stars, wrote that Tarzan "lacks that special pizazz that the string of Disney cartoon features from The Little Mermaid through The Lion King all had". He found faults in the film's removal of all African characters, lack of romantic tension between Tarzan and Jane, and the songs by Phil Collins, comparing them unfavorably with Elton John's "showstoppers" for The Lion King. He wrote "depriving the characters of big numbers weakens the movie".

Ty Burr of Entertainment Weekly gave the soundtrack a B−, stating that it was awkwardly split between Collins's songs and the traditional score, was burdened by too many alternate versions of the tracks, and in some instances bore similarities to the scores of The Lion King and Star Wars.

Accolades

The film is recognized by American Film Institute in these lists:
 2004: AFI's 100 Years...100 Songs:
 "You'll Be in My Heart" – Nominated
 2008: AFI's 10 Top 10:
 Nominated Animation Film

Adaptations

A spin-off animated series, The Legend of Tarzan, ran from 2001 to 2003. The series picks up where the film left off, with Tarzan adjusting to his new role as leader of the apes following Kerchak's death, and Jane (whom he has since married) adjusting to life in the jungle. In July 1999, Disney announced that they were planning a sequel for Tarzan. In 2002, Tarzan & Jane was released as a direct-to-video sequel, with Michael T. Weiss replacing Goldwyn as the voice of Tarzan. Tarzan II, a direct-to-video follow-up, was released in 2005.

A Broadway musical produced by Disney Theatrical, also titled Tarzan, began previews on March 24, 2006. It had an official opening night on May 10 of the same year. After running for over a year on Broadway, the show closed on July 8, 2007.

Five Tarzan video games have been released on various platforms. Tarzan's home is also featured as a playable world, "Deep Jungle", in the 2002 game Kingdom Hearts, and in the 2013 HD remaster Kingdom Hearts HD 1.5 Remix, in which Goldwyn and Blessed were the only actors from the film to reprise their roles, while Jane was voiced by Naia Kelly and Audrey Wasilewski reprised her role as Terk from the 1999 video game based on the film; Kerchak and Kala appeared, but were silent, while Tantor and Professor Porter were absent. The world was originally meant to return in Kingdom Hearts: Chain of Memories, but ultimately did not appear and has not appeared in any subsequent Kingdom Hearts games.

References

External links

 
 
 
 
 
 
 
 
 

1999 films
1999 animated films
1999 comedy films
1999 directorial debut films
1999 drama films
1990s action adventure films
1990s American animated films
1990s English-language films
1990s musical comedy-drama films
1990s musical fantasy films
Films set in the 1880s
American action adventure films
American adventure drama films
Animated drama films
American musical comedy-drama films
American musical fantasy films
Animated adventure films
Animated coming-of-age films
Animated musical films
Animated romance films
Animated films about orphans
Animated films based on novels
Animated films about gorillas
Animated films about elephants
Annie Award winners
Disney Renaissance
Films about animals
Films adapted into comics
Films adapted into plays
Films adapted into television shows
Films directed by Chris Buck
Films directed by Kevin Lima
Films produced by Bonnie Arnold
Films scored by Mark Mancina
Films set in Africa
Films set in jungles
Films that won the Best Original Song Academy Award
Films with screenplays by Tab Murphy
Films with screenplays by Noni White
Films with screenplays by Bob Tzudiker
Musicals by Phil Collins
Tarzan films
Tarzan (franchise)
Walt Disney Animation Studios films
Walt Disney Pictures animated films